Events in the year 1813 in Norway.

Incumbents
 Monarch: Frederick VI

Events
 5 January - Denmark-Norway declared bankruptcy and a new state bank, the Rigsbank, was created.
 1 May - Christian Frederick is appointed Steward of Norway.
 2 October - The Norwegian Students' Society was established.

Arts and literature
 The Norwegian journal Historisk-philosophiske Samlinger (Historical-Philosophical Collections) final issue was published.

Births
 23 January – Camilla Collett, writer and feminist (d.1895)
 18 February – Harald Ulrik Sverdrup, priest and politician (d.1891)
 5 August – Ivar Aasen, philologist, lexicographer, playwright and poet (d.1896)
 19 November – Augusta Smith, actor and opera singer (d.1900)

Full date unknown
 Christen Knudsen, ship-owner (d.1888)
 Jørgen Moe, bishop and author (d.1882)
 Christian Tønsberg, bookseller, publisher and writer (d.1897)

Deaths
 12 August – Matz Jenssen, businessperson (b.1760)

See also